Julio César Fuentes Vicente (born 3 February 1968) is a Uruguayan football manager and former player who played as a goalkeeper.

Playing career
Born in Montevideo, Fuentes made his senior debut with hometown side River Plate. In 1996, after playing for Sud América, he moved abroad and joined Paraguayan side Nacional Asunción.

Fuentes played for a brief period with Cerro before returning to Nacional in 1998. He then represented Leones Negros UdeG, Rentistas (two stints), Deportes Tolima and Liverpool Montevideo before retiring with Rampla Juniors in 2004, aged 36.

Managerial career
After retiring, Fuentes started his managerial career with La Luz in 2006. He then worked at Deportivo Maldonado in 2009, before moving to Brazil with 14 de Julho.

In 2013, Fuentes was in charge of Rentistas' youth categories, before joining Sud América in 2015, under the same capacity. On 22 April 2016, he was named interim manager of the first team of the latter, and remained as manager until the end of the year.

On 6 June 2017, Fuentes returned to Rentistas, now as first team manager. He left at the end of the season, and took over Rampla Juniors on 8 May 2018; on 11 September, however, he was sacked.

On 6 June 2019, Fuentes was named manager of Bolivian side Aurora, but resigned on 10 September. He later worked as a sporting director at La Luz, before being appointed Central Español manager on 14 October 2020.

As Central named Mario Szlafmyc as their manager in January 2021, Fuentes returned to La Luz, now as manager. He led the club to two consecutive promotions, the latter one to Primera División, and also reached the 2022 Copa Uruguay final.

On 17 February 2023, with just two matches into the new season, Fuentes left La Luz on a mutual agreement.

References

External links
 

1968 births
Living people
Footballers from Montevideo
Uruguayan footballers
Association football goalkeepers
Uruguayan Primera División players
Club Atlético River Plate (Montevideo) players
Sud América players
Club Nacional footballers
C.A. Cerro players
Leones Negros UdeG footballers
C.A. Rentistas players
Deportes Tolima footballers
Liverpool F.C. (Montevideo) players
Rampla Juniors players
Uruguayan expatriate footballers
Uruguayan expatriate sportspeople in Paraguay
Uruguayan expatriate sportspeople in Mexico
Uruguayan expatriate sportspeople in Colombia
Expatriate footballers in Paraguay
Expatriate footballers in Mexico
Expatriate footballers in Colombia
Uruguayan football managers
Uruguayan Primera División managers
Deportivo Maldonado managers
Sud América managers
C.A. Rentistas managers
Rampla Juniors managers
Club Aurora managers
Central Español managers
Uruguayan expatriate football managers
Uruguayan expatriate sportspeople in Brazil
Uruguayan expatriate sportspeople in Bolivia
Expatriate football managers in Brazil
Expatriate football managers in Bolivia
La Luz F.C. managers